Dwight Garner (born January 8, 1965) is an American journalist and longtime writer and editor for The New York Times. In 2008, he was named a book critic for the newspaper. He is the author of Garner's Quotations: A Modern Miscellany and Read Me: A Century of Classic American Book Advertisements.

Journalism and writing 

Garner's previous post at The New York Times was as senior editor of The New York Times Book Review, where he worked from 1999 to 2008. He was a founding editor of Salon.com, where he worked from 1995 to 1998. His monthly column in Esquire magazine was a finalist for the National Magazine Award in 2017.

His essays and journalism have appeared in The New York Times Magazine, Harper's Magazine, The Times Literary Supplement, the Oxford American, Slate, The Village Voice, the Boston Phoenix, The Nation, and elsewhere. For several years he wrote the program notes for Lincoln Center's American Songbook Series. He has served on the board of the National Book Critics Circle. In a January 2011 column for Slate, the journalist Timothy Noah called Garner a "highly gifted critic" who had reinvigorated The New York Timess literary coverage, and likened him to Anatole Broyard and John Leonard.

"If you read just one literary critic in the Times, you should read Dwight Garner. But let's say you don't read any books sections, which would sadly put you in the vast majority of the population: You should still read Dwight Garner", Benjamin Errett wrote in Toronto's The National Post. Garner "is an excellent guide to what to read, so much so that he's often all you need to read."

Garner wrote a biweekly column for The New York Times called "American Beauties", which focused on under-sung American books of the past 75 years. His championing of certain titles—including The Complete Novels of Charles Wright and On Fire by Larry Brown—helped return them to print. For Esquire, Garner played in the 2017 World Backgammon Championship in Monaco.

Early life and work 

Garner was born in Fairmont, West Virginia and grew up in that state and in Naples, Florida. Garner graduated from Middlebury College, where he majored in American literature. While in college, he wrote book criticism for The Village Voice, music and theater criticism for the Vanguard Press, a Burlington, Vermont alternative weekly, and was a stringer for The New York Times.

After his graduation from college, Garner was a reporter for The Addison Independent. He then became the arts editor of Vermont Times, a new alternative weekly in Burlington. He also became a contributing editor to the Boston Phoenix. In the 1990s Garner was a columnist for the Hungry Mind Review. After moving to New York City in 1994, he worked for one year as an associate editor at Harper's Bazaar  under the editorship of Liz Tilberis.

Garner lives in New York City with his wife, the writer Cree LeFavour.  He has two children and is a member of the Organ Meat Society.

References

External links
The New York Times archive of reviews
Knight News interview, 2007

American literary critics
1965 births
Living people
Critics employed by The New York Times
Middlebury College alumni
Journalists from West Virginia
People from Fairmont, West Virginia
20th-century American journalists
American male journalists